Cleonymus was a political ally of Cleon and an Athenian general. In 424 BC, Cleonymus had dropped his shield in battle and fled and was branded a coward. This act is often used to comic effect by Aristophanes.

References
Martin Ostwald. From Popular Sovereignty to the Sovereignty of Law: Law, Society and Politics in Fifth-Century Athens. University of California Press, 1990. ; pp. 205–206; p. 231
Aristophanes, The Birds, 289-290.  (Translated by Peter Meineck). Aristophanes 1 : Clouds, Wasps, Birds. Hackett Publishing Company, 1998. 

5th-century BC Athenians
Ancient Athenian generals
Athenians of the Peloponnesian War